Joel Arimany Sala (born 28 May 1998) is a Spanish footballer who plays for UE Figueres as a forward.

Club career
Born in Quart, Girona, Catalonia, Arimany was a Girona FC youth graduate. In July 2015, after being called up by first team manager Pablo Machín for the pre-season, he was linked to Málaga CF, but nothing came of it.

On 11 August 2015, Arimany signed a new four-year deal with the Blanquivermells. On 24 October, without even appearing with the reserves, Arimany made his main squad debut, coming on as a late substitute for Felipe Sanchón in a 0–0 home draw against Real Zaragoza in the Segunda División.

On 20 July 2016, Arimany was loaned to Málaga, returning to youth football. Upon returning, he was assigned to the B-team in Segunda División B before returning to Málaga on 27 August 2018; he was assigned to the reserves also in the third division.

On 8 January 2020, after a short stint at UE Olot, Arimany moved to another reserve team, Deportivo Aragón still in division three.

References

External links

1998 births
Living people
People from Gironès
Sportspeople from the Province of Girona
Spanish footballers
Footballers from Catalonia
Association football forwards
Segunda División players
Segunda División B players
Tercera División players
Girona FC players
Atlético Malagueño players
CF Peralada players
UE Olot players
Real Zaragoza B players
UE Figueres footballers